Mary McCallum Webster  (31 December 1906 - 7 November 1985) was a British botanist. She was a Fellow of the Linnean Society of London.

Early life 
She was born in Sussex. McCallum Webster initially trained as a children's nurse, however retrained at Aldershot as a cook in order to join the Auxiliary Territorial Service in World War II.

Botany Work 
McCallum Webster continued to work as a cook after the war, spending winters working and summers focusing on botany. She worked for the School of Botany, Cambridge University, and the Royal Botanic Gardens, Kew, McCallum Webster was a member of several botany focused groups, including the Botanical Society of Britain and Ireland, Botanical Society of Scotland,  and the Moray Field Club, as well as being a Fellow of the Linnean Society of London. Wintergreens were a particular area of interest for McCallum Webster, as noted on her memorial in Culbin Forest. Some have claimed that while McCallum Webster was an expert on wintergreens particularly in the Moray region of Scotland, she was deliberately vague about the exact sites of her finds and that botanists were taken to sites by Webster "on a deliberately tortuous route along forest tracks which made relocation practically impossible".

Works 
 Flora of Moray, Nairn and East Inverness, 1978. ISBN 9780900015427

References 

1906 births
1985 deaths
British women botanists